George Vaughan may refer to:

 George Vaughan (New Hampshire official) (1676–1725), colonial lieutenant governor of New Hampshire
 George Edgar Vaughan (1907–1994), British diplomat

See also
 George Vaughan Hart (British Army officer) (1752–1832), British Army officer and politician
 George Vaughan Hart (lawyer) (1841–1912), Anglo-Irish academic
 George Vaughn (disambiguation)